Meols Meadows is a  Site of Special Scientific Interest on the Wirral Peninsula, England. The site was notified in 1988 due to its biological features which is predominantly damp unimproved neutral grassland, and is the best example of this MG5 community in Merseyside and Greater Manchester.

References
Natural England citation sheet

External links
Metropolitan Borough of Wirral: Meols Meadow Site of Special Scientific Interest

Sites of Special Scientific Interest in Merseyside
Meadows in Merseyside